Viscount Doneraile is a title that has been created twice in the Peerage of Ireland, both times for members of the St Leger family.

It was first created in 1703 for Arthur St Leger, along with the subsidiary title of Baron Kilmayden, also in the Peerage of Ireland. This creation became extinct in 1767 upon the death of the fourth Viscount. His daughter, Elizabeth, had a son named St Leger Aldworth, who succeeded to the Doneraile estates and assumed the surname of St Leger in lieu of his patronymic. He notably represented Doneraile in the Irish Parliament from 1749 to 1776. The latter year, he was raised to the Peerage of Ireland as Baron Doneraile. In 1785, the viscountcy was revived and he was created Viscount Doneraile, also in the Peerage of Ireland.

His grandson, the third Viscount, sat in the House of Lords as an Irish Representative Peer from 1830 to 1854. His son, the fourth Viscount, was an Irish Representative Peer between 1855 and 1887. He was succeeded by his second cousin, the fifth Viscount. His son, the sixth Viscount, served as Mayor of the City of Westminster.

On the death of his younger brother, the seventh Viscount, this line of the family failed, and he was succeeded by his second cousin once removed, the eighth Viscount. , the titles are held by the latter's grandson, the tenth Viscount, who succeeded his father in 1983. He lives in California.

The family seat was Doneraile Court, near Mallow, County Cork.

Viscounts Doneraile, First Creation (1703)
Arthur St Leger, 1st Viscount Doneraile (died 1727)
Arthur St Leger, 2nd Viscount Doneraile (1694–1734)
Arthur Mohun St Leger, 3rd Viscount Doneraile (1718–1750)
Hayes St Leger, 4th Viscount Doneraile (1702–1767)

Viscounts Doneraile, Second Creation (1785)
St Leger St Leger, 1st Viscount Doneraile (died 1787)
Hayes St Leger, 2nd Viscount Doneraile (1755–1819)
Hayes St Leger, 3rd Viscount Doneraile (1786–1854)
Hayes St Leger, 4th Viscount Doneraile (1818–1887)
Richard Arthur St Leger, 5th Viscount Doneraile (1825–1891)
Edward St Leger, 6th Viscount Doneraile (1866–1941)
Hugh St Leger, 7th Viscount Doneraile (1869–1956)
Algernon Edward St Leger, 8th Viscount Doneraile (1878–1957)
Richard St John St Leger, 9th Viscount Doneraile (1923–1983)
Richard Allen St Leger, 10th Viscount Doneraile (born 1946)

The heir apparent is the present holder's son, the Hon. Nathaniel Warham Robert St John St Leger (born 1971).

References

Kidd, Charles, Williamson, David (editors). Debrett's Peerage and Baronetage (1990 edition). New York: St Martin's Press, 1990.

External links

Cracroft's Peerage page

Viscountcies in the Peerage of Ireland
Extinct viscountcies in the Peerage of Ireland
1703 establishments in Ireland
1785 establishments in Ireland
Noble titles created in 1703
Noble titles created in 1785
St Leger family